Ruan Jingsong (阮靖淞; born 26 March 1997) is a Chinese swimmer.

He represented China at the 2020 Summer Paralympics in Tokyo, where he won a silver medal in the men's 50m Backstroke event.

References 

1997 births
Living people
Sportspeople from Kunming
Chinese male backstroke swimmers
Paralympic swimmers of China
Paralympic silver medalists for China
Paralympic medalists in swimming
Swimmers at the 2020 Summer Paralympics
Medalists at the 2020 Summer Paralympics
S5-classified Paralympic swimmers
21st-century Chinese people